The AFL Women's Rising Star is an Australian rules football award given annually to the best young player in the AFL Women's (AFLW) for the year. Two eligible players are nominated each round of the home-and-away season; the players must have been under 21 at the beginning of the year and cannot have been previously nominated. Players suspended during the year cannot win. After the season's completion, an expert panel votes on the recipient.

In 2016, National Australia Bank expanded its 14-year sponsorship of the Australian Football League (AFL) to the women's competition, including the naming rights to its Rising Star award, ahead of its first season in 2017. The inaugural Rising Star, who won $20,000, was announced at the AFLW's awards ceremony on 28 March, held at Peninsula, an event space in Docklands, Melbourne. The ceremony was live-streamed on the AFL's website and mobile app. The ten members of the year's voting panel were Mark Evans, Darren Flanigan, Ros Lanigan, Simon Lethlean, Jennie Loughnan, Peta Searle, Kevin Sheehan, Kelli Underwood, Josh Vanderloo and Shelley Ware.

A midfielder, she led the league in tackles, laying a total of 70 for the season. She played in Adelaide's premiership side and was also named on the interchange bench in the season's AFLW All-Australian team.  amassed the most nominations during the season, with four players (Deanna Berry, Jasmine Grierson, Lily Mithen and Katherine Smith) selected.

Nominations

Final voting

See also
2017 AFL Rising Star

References

2017 AFL Women's season
Australian rules football-related lists